Don Ananda Weerakoon (Sinhala:ආනන්ද වීරකෝන්)  was one of the early Sri Lankan film actors in the 1950s.

Life and career

Early life

Ananda was born as only son in a family of five children to parents Don William Weerakoon and Amarawathi Kalansuriya. He was educated at Nalanda College Colombo and was also a Bachelor of Arts degree holder. Since school days he had been keenly interested in history and arts. He first participated in a dance to welcome the Queen Elizabeth II's visit to Ceylon together with Shesha Palihakkara and Titus Thotawatte at the Colombo Regal Hall.

Film acting

He first started acting in a film as a young boy called "Harry" in one of the films directed by Sirisena Wimalaweera. Later on Ananda had been acting in many films directed by Sirisena Wimalaweera such as Asoka (1955 film) and Lester James Peries's Rekava film. In 2021, he was honored with lifetime achievement award during the ceremony held for 21 artists who made an invaluable contribution to Sinhala cinema in the early decades of Sinhala Cinema.

Stay in England

In 1960, Ananda moved to the United Kingdom and since then he worked as an insurance agent in London for 29 years.

Filmography

References

External links
 

 

 

 

 

Sinhalese male actors
Sri Lankan male film actors
Sri Lankan Buddhists
Alumni of Nalanda College, Colombo
1934 births
Living people